José Ángel Jurado de la Torre (born 21 June 1992), known as José Ángel, is a Spanish professional footballer who plays as a central midfielder for CD Tenerife.

Club career
Born in Seville, Andalusia, José Ángel graduated from Real Betis' youth setup, and made his senior debut with their reserves in the 2010–11 season, in the Segunda División B. In July 2011 he joined another reserve team, Villarreal CF B, and was immediately loaned to CD Mirandés in the same league.

José Ángel returned to the Yellow Submarine in June 2012 after winning promotion with the Castile and León club, and appeared regularly over two seasons. On 14 July 2014 he moved to UD Almería, being assigned to the B side also in the third division.

José Ángel played his first match as a professional on 5 December 2014, coming on as a substitute for Corona in the 67th minute of a 4–3 away win against Real Betis in the round of 32 of the Copa del Rey. On 14 June 2015 he was promoted to the main squad, now in the Segunda División.

José Ángel made his debut in division two on 23 August 2015, replacing Mohammed Fatau in a 3–2 home victory over CD Leganés. He scored his first professional goal on 27 March of the following year, the equaliser in a 1–1 draw to RCD Mallorca also at the Estadio de los Juegos Mediterráneos.

On 31 January 2017, José Ángel's contract – which was due to expire in the end of the campaign – was terminated by the club. On 17 March, he moved abroad for the first time in his career after signing a one-year deal at FK Bodø/Glimt in the Norwegian First Division.

On 15 February 2019, José Ángel joined Moldovan National Division side FC Sheriff Tiraspol on loan. He returned to his country on 27 August, with third-tier FC Cartagena.

A backup to Adalberto Carrasquilla and Miguel Ángel Cordero in his first season as Efesé achieved promotion, José Ángel subsequently became first choice and helped the club to avoid relegation in the second. On 8 July 2021 he renewed his contract for a further year, but was transferred to Emirati club Al Wahda FC fifteen days later.

José Ángel returned to Cartagena on 12 January 2022, after agreeing to a deal until the end of the campaign. Three days later, however, the club announced his departure on a mutual agreement as they were unable to register him, and on 16 January he signed with AD Alcorcón until 30 June.

On 3 July 2022, José Ángel joined CD Tenerife still in the second division on a two-year contract.

Career statistics

Club

References

External links

1992 births
Living people
Spanish footballers
Footballers from Seville
Association football midfielders
Segunda División players
Segunda División B players
Betis Deportivo Balompié footballers
CD Mirandés footballers
Villarreal CF B players
UD Almería B players
UD Almería players
FC Cartagena footballers
AD Alcorcón footballers
CD Tenerife players
Eliteserien players
Norwegian First Division players
FK Bodø/Glimt players
Moldovan Super Liga players
FC Sheriff Tiraspol players
UAE Pro League players
Al Wahda FC players
Spanish expatriate footballers
Expatriate footballers in Norway
Expatriate footballers in Moldova
Expatriate footballers in the United Arab Emirates
Spanish expatriate sportspeople in Norway
Spanish expatriate sportspeople in Moldova
Spanish expatriate sportspeople in the United Arab Emirates